Pallo may refer to:

People
 Alimamy Pallo Bangura, politician in Sierra Leone
 Jackie Pallo (1926–2006), English professional wrestler
 Jorge Pallo, American actor
 Pallo Jordan (born 1942), South African politician

Football clubs
 Aseman Pallo (AsPa), Finnish football club based in Aura; see Bertrand Okafor
 Käpylän Pallo (KäPa), Swedish football club from the Käpylä district of Helsinki
 Pallo-Iirot, Finnish football club based in Rauma
 Tampereen Pallo-Veikot (TPV), Finnish football club playing in Tampere